Froissy is a commune in the Oise department in northern France.  On November 25, 1968, the village was the site of a fire at a home for disabled children that killed 14 boys and girls ranging in age from 10 to 14 years of age.

See also
 Communes of the Oise department

References

Communes of Oise